Andrew D. Armour (24 July 1883 – 4 March 1955) was a Scottish professional footballer who played in the Scottish League for Kilmarnock and Queen's Park as an outside right. He also played in the Football League for Huddersfield Town and represented the Scottish League XI.

Personal life 
Armour served as an acting sergeant in the Army Service Corps during the First World War.

Career statistics

References

1883 births
1955 deaths
Footballers from Irvine, North Ayrshire
Scottish footballers
Association football outside forwards
English Football League players
Kilmarnock F.C. players
Huddersfield Town A.F.C. players
Scottish Football League representative players
Scottish Football League players
Queen's Park F.C. players
Irvine Meadow XI F.C. players
Clydebank F.C. (1914) players
British Army personnel of World War I
Royal Army Service Corps soldiers
Scottish Junior Football Association players